"A Long Time Ago" is a song written by Richard Mainegra, and recorded by American country music group The Remingtons. It was released in October 1991 as their debut single and the first from their album Blue Frontier. The song reached number 10 on the Billboard Hot Country Singles & Tracks chart in January 1992.

Music video
The music video was directed by Gustavo Garzon and premiered in late 1991.

Chart performance

References

The Remingtons songs
Song recordings produced by Josh Leo
BNA Records singles
1991 debut singles
1991 songs
Songs written by Richard Mainegra